Louis-Urbain-Aubert de Tourny (1695, in Les Andelys – 1760, in Paris) was a French administrator active in 18th century Bordeaux. 

At first maître des requêtes, in 1730 he was made intendant to Limoges. In 1743, he became intendant of Guyenne in Bordeaux. He beautified the quays on the Garonne, adding buildings, opening avenues and creating a public garden. He was made conseiller d'État in 1757.

Bibliography
L'intendant Tourny 1695-1760 by Lheritier Michel.

1695 births
1760 deaths
Ancien Régime office-holders